Receiving The Gift of Flavor is the fourth studio album by The Urge. It was originally released in 1995 in cassette and CD format under the band's own label Neat Guy Recordings. After the band was signed to Immortal Records, the album was re-released switching out the song "Killing is Easy" for "Take Away" in 1996. The album produced three singles ("Brainless", "All Washed Up" and "It's Gettin' Hectic") and sold 150,000 copies.

To celebrate the 20th anniversary of the album, the band re-recorded the album live before a studio audience at the Ozark Theater in Webster Groves, MO on August 15, 2015.
The live re-recording was released on November 20, 2015, and includes similar cover art with a blue background.

Track listing

Notes

  "Killing Is Easy" was replaced by "Take Away" in the 1996 Immortal Records release.

Personnel

The Urge 
Steve Ewing - vocals
Karl Grable - bass, art direction, design
Jerry Jost - guitars
John Pessoni - drums
Bill Reiter - saxophone
Matt Kwiatkowski - trombone
Todd Painter - trombone, keyboards

Other personnel
Simon Bartholomew, Keith Elam, Jan Kincaid, Andrew Levy - composers for "It's Gettin' Hectic"
Jeff Finazzo - design, photography
Brad Kopplan - engineer, mixing
Eng Kopplan - mixing
Ken Paulakovich - engineer, mixing
Eddy Schreyer	- mastering
Michael Vail Blum - engineer, mixing, producer, remixing
Lou Whitney - assistant engineer, studio assistant

References 

The Urge albums
1995 albums